Sandy Ann Rivera Talag (born June 11, 1998) is a Filipina actress, singer, radio host and model. She rose to fame through the television talent search show StarStruck Kids.

Filmography

Television

Movies

Other appearances
Sandy became the youngest of 5 celebrities who have won the one-million peso jackpot on the celebrity game show All Star K! when she sang Chaka Khan's song "Through the Fire".

Awards and nominations

References

External links

http://www.liletneverhappened.org/Lilet.html

1998 births
Living people
Filipino child actresses
Filipino film actresses
Filipino television actresses
GMA Network personalities
StarStruck Kids participants
People from Baguio
Ilocano people